The United Arab Emirates competed at the 2022 World Games held in Birmingham, United States from 7 to 17 July 2022. Athletes representing the United Arab Emirates won two gold medals, one silver medal and five bronze medals. The country finished in 28th place in the medal table.

Medalists

Competitors
The following is the list of number of competitors in the Games.

Air sports

United Arab Emirates won one bronze medal in air sports.

Duathlon

United Arab Emirates competed in duathlon.

Ju-jitsu

United Arab Emirates won five medals in ju-jitsu.

Muaythai

United Arab Emirates won two bronze medals in muaythai.

References

Nations at the 2022 World Games
2022
World Games